The Bōsō Peninsula in Japan was struck by a major tsunami on 4 November 1677, caused by an earthquake at the southern end of the Japan Trench. It was felt onshore with only a maximum of 4 on the JMA intensity scale, but had an estimated magnitude of 8.3–8.6 . The disparity between the maximum intensity and the magnitude estimated from the tsunami suggest that this was a tsunami earthquake. There no records of significant damage caused by the shaking, but the resulting tsunami caused widespread damage and an estimated 569 people were killed

See also
List of earthquakes in Japan
List of historical earthquakes

References

1677 earthquakes
Tsunami earthquakes
Megathrust earthquakes in Japan
Tsunamis in Japan
1677 in Japan
Earthquakes of the Edo period